The Canadian Association of Lutheran Congregations (CALC) is a small Lutheran denomination in Canada. Along with the Evangelical Lutheran Church in Canada and the Lutheran Church–Canada, it is one of only three all-Canadian Lutheran denominations. It is the third largest lutheran body in Canada, after the ELCIC and the LCC respectively.

History
CALC was founded in the early 1990s by a group of Lutherans who strove to keep to keep the authority of Scripture central to the life of their churches and their faith. It was formally incorporated by an act of Parliament in June 1994. It is today the third largest Lutheran denomination in Canada.

Seminary
The official seminary of CALC is the Institute of Lutheran Theology (ILT), located in Brookings, South Dakota. In partnership with ILT, it trains all its pastors through a unique program called The Shepherd's Pathway.

Membership
From a single congregation in 1992, CALC has grown to include 33 congregations in 5 Canadian provinces. (British Columbia, 6; Alberta, 16; Saskatchewan, 3; Manitoba, 1; Ontario, 7)
British Columbia
Basel Hakka Lutheran Church, Vancouver
Grace Lutheran Church West Kelowna
Martin Luther Evangelical Lutheran Church, Vancouver
Mount Calvary Lutheran Church, Mission
St. Andrew's Lutheran Church, Kamloops
Vancouver Chinese Lutheran Church, Burnaby
Alberta
Asker Lutheran Church, Ponoka
Bardo Lutheran Church, Tofield
Bethel Lutheran Church, Marwayne
Calvary Evangelical Lutheran Church, Wetaskiwin
Christ Lutheran Church, Sexsmith
Emmaus Lutheran Church, Edmonton
Faith Lutheran Church, Calgary
Golden Valley Lutheran Church, Viking
Immanuel Lutheran Church of Rosenthal, Stony Plain
Journey's Lutheran Church, Grande Prairie
Peace Lutheran Church, Wainwright
Salem Lutheran Church, Kingman
Sharon Lutheran Church, Irma
St. Peter's Lutheran Church, Cochrane
Trondhjem Lutheran Church, Round Hill
Victory Lutheran Church, Medicine Hat
Saskatchewan
Immanuel Lutheran Church, Parkside
St. John North Prairie Lutheran Church, Preeceville
Trinity Lutheran Church, Leader
Manitoba
Christ Lutheran Church, Morden
Ontario
All Saints Lutheran Church, Ottawa
Evangelical Lutheran Church of the Good Shepherd, Toronto
Faith Lutheran Church, North York
Goodwood Uxbridge Lutheran Church, Goodwood
Resurrection Lutheran Church, Pembroke
St. Matthew's Lutheran Church, Cornwall
St. Peter's Lutheran Church, Sullivan

References

External links
 

Lutheran organizations
Lutheranism in Canada
Lutheran denominations in North America
1992 establishments in Canada
Christian organizations established in 1992